Marshallia obovata, also known as spoonshape Barbara's buttons and Piedmont Barbara's buttons, is a flowering plant species in the family Asteraceae. It is endemic to the Southern United States, especially in the state of North Carolina.

Description
It has white blooms. The stems grow to 2 feet tall.

References

Helenieae
Endemic flora of the United States
Flora of the Southeastern United States
Flora of North Carolina
Flora without expected TNC conservation status